Harbin Bank Co., Ltd. is a Chinese city-based commercial bank, with its headquarters in Harbin, Heilongjiang Province. It was established in 1997 as Harbin City Commercial Bank, opened its branches in Harbin City only, but changed its name to Harbin Bank in 2007 and has since opened branches in Dalian, Tianjin, Shuangyashan and Jixi. It ranks 4th by Comprehensive competitiveness among Chinese city commercial banks in 2011.

History
The bank was formerly named "HRBank", a portmanteau of "Harbin" (name of the city) and "Bank". But due to its ambiguity, the name has been changed to the current one.

See also
 Harbin
 Banking in China
 Commercial banks in Northeast China
Dalian Bank, Shengjing Bank (Shenyang), Bank of Jilin (Changchun)

References

External links
    

Banks of China
Companies listed on the Hong Kong Stock Exchange
Companies based in Harbin
H shares